Tantkyitaung Pagoda, located across the Ayeyarwady River in Pakokku District, Magway Division, Myanmar (Burma) is a prominent Burmese Buddhist pagoda near the historic city of Bagan, believed to enshrine four tooth relics of Gautama Buddha.

It was built by King Anawrahta in 397 ME on Tantkyi Hill, where the royal white elephant bearing the tooth relics rested for the second time, after it sat at a place, market by Shin Myethna Thettawshay Pagoda, then at a place where heavy rains fell, market by Shin Mogaung Pagoda, and at a place where the elephant mustered its strength, market by Sin Min Thwin Pagoda.

Its nine tiers of umbrella contains a silver vane and the diamond bud. It has been renovated in successive periods. It has an image of Lord Buddha, a statue of Ananda and that of the forest guardian. A look down from the pagoda platform reveals the head of a dragon protruding from the walling down below. It is said that the tail end of this likeness of the dragon is around the site of Shwezigon Pagoda.

References

Pagodas in Myanmar
Religious buildings and structures completed in 1035
11th-century Buddhist temples